The Grand Illusion is the seventh studio album by American rock band Styx. Recorded at Paragon Recording Studios in Chicago, the album was released on July 7, 1977, by A&M Records. (Intentionally choosing the combination 7th on 7-7-77 for luck). The release was a smash worldwide, selling three million copies in the US (Triple Platinum) alone. Some estimates have the album at over 6 million copies sold. The album launched the band to stardom and spawned the hit singles "Come Sail Away" and "Fooling Yourself." The title track also received substantial FM airplay, but was never released as an official single.

The album cover art is based on Rene Magritte's 1965 painting, "The Blank Signature".

Background and songs
As with much of Styx's catalog, many of the songs have quasi-medieval/fantasy lyrics and themes. Some are allegories and commentaries on contemporary American life and the members' experiences in an American rock band in the mid-to-late 1970s, such as "Castle Walls", "Superstars", "Miss America" and the title track, which touches on "The Grand Illusion" of fame and fortune and how they are not what they appear.

Classic Rock critic Malcolm Dome rated the title track as Styx all-time greatest song.  He also rated "Come Sail Away" as the band's 7th greatest song.

Tommy Shaw wrote the emotionally deep song "Man in the Wilderness" after watching a Kansas performance in Detroit, which they had played as the opening act. He has called it "Epic! Unlike any presentation of rock music I'd ever experienced. To go that big opened up all kinds of ideas in my mind, and the next time I was alone with my acoustic, the song more or less unfolded itself." The lyrics stem from his experiences of rising to fame with Styx as well as his brother being sent off to fight in the Vietnam War, as a pawn for the strategies of politicians in Washington, D.C.

"Come Sail Away" uses sailing as a metaphor to achieve one's dreams and the yearning to sail away. The lyrics touch on nostalgia of "childhood friends," escapism, and a religious theme symbolized by "a gathering of angels" singing "a song of hope." The ending lyrics explain a transformation from a sailing ship into a starship: "They climbed aboard their starship and headed for the skies," words evoking biblical verses from Ezekiel (1:1-28). However, DeYoung revealed on In the Studio with Redbeard (which devoted an entire episode to the making of The Grand Illusion) that he was depressed when he wrote the track because Styx's first two A&M offerings, Equinox and Crystal Ball, had sold fewer units than expected after the success of the single "Lady". Musically, it combines a plaintive, ballad-like opening section (including piano and synthesizer interludes) with a bombastic, guitar-heavy second half. In the middle of the second half it features a minute-long instrumental break on synthesizer, characteristic of progressive rock, after which the guitar returns with a catchy chorus.

"Fooling Yourself (The Angry Young Man)" was written by Shaw. It was originally based on Shaw's initial perception of DeYoung who was an "angry young man" who viewed the group's successes with a wary eye and grew angry or depressed with every setback. It was only in later years that Shaw began to see himself in the lyrics, and the song took on a more personal meaning to him.

The closing track, "The Grand Finale," combines the themes of the songs on the album.

Track listing

Personnel

Styx
 Dennis DeYoung – vocals, keyboards
 James "JY" Young – vocals, electric guitars, synthesizer on "Come Sail Away"
 Tommy Shaw – vocals, electric and acoustic guitars
 Chuck Panozzo – bass guitar
 John Panozzo – drums, percussion

Production
 Barry Mraz – production assistance, engineer
 Rob Kingsland – engineer
 Mastered by Mike Reese at the Mastering Lab, Los Angeles, California
 Roland Young – art direction
 Jim McCrary – photography
 Chuck Beeson – album design
 Kelly and Mouse – album cover painting

Charts

Album

Singles

References

External links 
 Styx - The Grand Illusion (1977) album review by Mike DeGagne, credits & releases at AllMusic.com
 Styx - The Grand Illusion (1977) album releases & credits at Discogs.com
 Styx - The Grand Illusion (1977) album credits & user reviews at ProgArchives.com
 Styx - The Grand Illusion (1977) album to be listened as stream at Spotify.com

1977 albums
A&M Records albums
Styx (band) albums